L. californica  may refer to:
 Lasthenia californica, the California goldfield, a flowering plant species native to California and Oregon
 Lophelia californica, a synonym for Lophelia pertusa, a cold-water coral species which grows in the deep waters throughout the North Atlantic Ocean

See also
 List of Latin and Greek words commonly used in systematic names#C